Padrai (as known as Pindrai) is a village under Pindra Tehsil, Varanasi, Uttar Pradesh.

References

Villages in Varanasi district